The 2010 Kansas State Wildcats baseball team represents Kansas State University in the NCAA Division I college baseball season of 2010. It is the 110th baseball season in school history.

The team's head coach is Brad Hill who is in his seventh season at Kansas State. He was previously the head coach at Central Missouri State before coming to Manhattan in 2004.

Season

Regular season

Conference Tournament

NCAA Tournament

Roster

Coaches

Schedule/results 

|- align="center" bgcolor="#ddffdd"
| 1 || February 19 || vs  || 11–5 || Riley Park || Daniel || Young || Allen || 240 || 1–0 || 0–0
|- align="center" bgcolor="#ffdddd"
| 2 || February 20 || vs   || 6–10 || Riley Park || McNally ||  ||   || 208 || 1–1 || 0–0
|- align="center" bgcolor="#ddffdd"
| 3 || February 21 || at The Citadel || 2–1 ||  Riley Park || Hunter || Clevinger || Allen || 601 || 2–1 || 0–0
|- align="center" bgcolor="#ddffdd"
| 4 || February 27 || vs  || 10–3 || Chain of Lakes Park || Daniel || Heck ||   || 102 || 3–1 || 0–0
|- align="center" bgcolor="#ddffdd"
| 5 || February 28 || vs  || 6–1 || Chain of Lakes Park  || Marshall || Ross ||   || 233 || 4–1 || 0–0
|- align="center" bgcolor="#ddffdd"
| 6 || March 1 || vs  || 14–7 (11) || Chain of Lakes Park || Allen || Steinbach ||   || 179 || 5–1 || 0–0
|- align="center" bgcolor="#ddffdd"
| 7 || March 2 || vs  || 27–8 || Chain of Lakes Park  || Lindsey || Kneibel ||  || 181 || 6–1 || 0–0
|- align="center" bgcolor="#ffdddd"
| 8 || March 3 || vs  || 5–8  || Chain of Lakes Park || Crimmel ||Bahramzadeh || McMyne || 232 || 6–2 || 0–0
|- align="center" bgcolor="#ddffdd"
| 9 || March 5 || at  || 14–6 || Conrad Park || Daniel || Caughel ||   || 729 || 7–2 || 0–0
|- align="center" bgcolor="#ddffdd"
| 10 || March 6 || vs  || 5–2 || Conrad Park || Marshall || Sabatino || Allen || 279 || 8–2 || 0–0
|- align="center" bgcolor="#ddffdd"
| 11 || March 7 || vs   || 6–1 || Conrad Park || Hunter || Eadington  ||   || 119 || 9–2 || 0–0
|- align="center" bgcolor="#ddffdd"
| 12 || March 12 ||  || 11–8 || Tointon Family Stadium || Daniel || Mace ||   || 577 || 10–2 || 0–0
|- align="center" bgcolor="#ddffdd"
| 13 || March 13 || Kent State || 10–9 (10) || Tointon Family Stadium || Allen || Weibley||   ||   || 11–2 || 0–0
|- align="center" bgcolor="#ddffdd"
| 14 || March 13 || Kent State || 7–1 || Tointon Family Stadium || Hunter || Sabo ||   || 809 || 12–2 || 0–0
|- align="center" bgcolor="#ddffdd"
| 15 || March 14 || Kent State ||  11–0 (7) || Tointon Family Stadium  || Lindsey || Hallock ||   || 693 || 13–2 || 0–0
|- align="center" bgcolor="#ffdddd"
| 16 || March 16 ||  || 4–7 || Tointon Family Stadium  || Winkelman || Rooke  ||   || 1,090 || 13–3 || 0–0
|- align="center" bgcolor="#ddffdd"
| 17 || March 19 ||  || 4–0 || Tointon Family Stadium  || Daniel || Schmidt ||   ||    || 14–3 || 0–0
|- align="center" bgcolor="#ddffdd"
| 18 || March 19 || UW–Milwaukee || 2–1 || Tointon Family Stadium || Rooke || Amsrud ||   || 589 || 15–3 || 0–0
|- align="center" bgcolor="#ddffdd"
| 19 || March 23  ||   || 7–1 || Tointon Family Stadium || Hunter || Trevino ||   || 864 || 16–3 || 0–0
|- align="center" bgcolor="#ddffdd"
| 20 || March 26 ||  || 14–11 || Tointon Family Stadium || Allen || Peck ||   || 1,539 || 17–3 || 1–0
|- align="center" bgcolor="#ddffdd"
| 21 || March 28 || Oklahoma State || 9–3 || Tointon Family Stadium || Rooke || Keeling ||   ||   || 18–3 || 2–0
|- align="center" bgcolor="#ddffdd"
| 22 || March 28 || Oklahoma State || 13–3 (7) || Tointon Family Stadium || Hunter || Chambers ||   || 1,374 || 19–3 || 3–0
|- align="center" bgcolor="#ddffdd"
| 23 || March 30 || #30  || 8–3 || Tointon Family Stadium || Applegate || Muncrief ||   || 4,745 || 20–3 || 3–0
|- align="center" bgcolor="#ffdddd"
| 24 || April 1 || at  || 5–8 ||Dan Law Field || Johnson ||Marshall ||   || 1,897 || 20–4 || 3–1
|- align="center" bgcolor="#ffdddd"
| 25 || April 2 || at Texas Tech || 4–13 || Dan Law Field || Doran|| Daniel || Bettis || 2,505 || 20–5  || 3–2
|- align="center" bgcolor="#ddffdd"
| 26 || April 3 || at Texas Tech || 10–6 || Dan Law Field || Allen || Bruening ||   || 2,846 || 21–5 || 4–2
|- align="center" bgcolor="#ffdddd"
| 27 || April 9 ||  || 3–5  || Tointon Family Stadium || Mariot  || Lindsey || Hauptman || 3,486 || 21–6 || 4–3
|- align="center" bgcolor="#ddffdd"
| 28 || April 10 || Nebraska || 13–5 || Tointon Family Stadium || Hunter || Tate ||   || 2,943 || 22–6 || 5–3
|- align="center" bgcolor="#ddffdd"
| 29 || April 11 || Nebraska || 8–3 || Tointon Family Stadium || Marshall || Lemke ||   || 2,111 || 23–6 || 6–3
|- align="center" bgcolor="#ffdddd"
| 30 || April 13 || at  || 9–15  || Larry H. Miller Field || Shutt || Bahramzadeh ||   || 421 || 23–7 || 6–3
|- align="center" bgcolor="#ffdddd"
| 31 || April 14 || at BYU || 10–13 || Larry H. Miller Field || Howard || Lindsey ||   || 717 || 23–8 || 6–3
|- align="center" bgcolor="#ddffdd"
| 32 || April 16||  || 5–2 || Tointon Family Stadium || Rooke || Tolleson || Allen || 2,248  || 24–8 || 7–3
|- align="center" bgcolor="#ddffdd"
| 33 || April 17 || Baylor || 5–2 || Tointon Family Stadium || Hunter || Verrett || Allen || 2,054 || 25–8 || 8–3
|- align="center" bgcolor="#ddffdd"
| 34 || April 18 || Baylor || 3–2 || Tointon Family Stadium || Lindsey || Kempf  || Marshall || 2,204 || 26–8 || 9–3
|- align="center" bgcolor="#ddffdd"
| 35 || April 20 || at Wichita State || 7–4 || Eck Stadium || Giannonatti || McGreevy ||   || 7,217 || 27–8 || 9–3
|- align="center" bgcolor="#ffdddd"
| 36 || April 25 || at Missouri || 2–4  || Taylor Stadium || Tepesh || Daniel || Emens || 214 || 27–8 || 9–4
|- align="center" bgcolor="#ffdddd"
| 37 || April 25 || at Missouri || 8–9 (10)  || Taylor Stadium || Fick || Marshall ||   || 214 || 27–9 || 9–5
|- align="center" bgcolor="#ddffdd"
| 38 || April 27 ||  || 12–4 || Tointon Family Stadium || Bahramzadeh || Day ||    || 1,916 || 28–9 || 9–5
|- align="center" bgcolor="#ddffdd"
| 39 || April 28 || Chicago State || 20–2 (7) || Tointon Family Stadium || Lindsey || Faron ||   || 717 || 29–9 || 9–5
|- align="center" bgcolor="#ffdddd"
| 40 || April 30 || at  || 3–14 || L. Dale Mitchell Baseball Park || Neal || Daniel  ||   || 1,026 || 29–10 || 9–6
|- align="center" bgcolor="#ddffdd"
| 41 || May 1 || at #15 Oklahoma || 14–9 || L. Dale Mitchell Baseball Park || Marshall || Shore ||   || 1,139 || 30–10 || 10–6
|- align="center" bgcolor="#ffdddd"
| 42 || May 2 || at #15 Oklahoma || 11–15 || L. Dale Mitchell Baseball Park || Mayfield || Lindsey ||   || 1,010 || 30–11 || 10–7
|- align="center" bgcolor="#ddffdd"
| 43 || May 4 ||  || 12–6 || Tointon Family Stadium || Giannonatti || Bechstein  ||   || 1,526 || 31–11 || 10–7
|- align="center" bgcolor="#ffdddd"
| 44 || May 5 || Minnesota || 0–3 || Tointon Family Stadium || Lubinsky || Applegate ||   || 941 || 31–12 || 10–7
|- align="center" bgcolor="#ddffdd"
| 45 || May 7 || #1 Texas || 2–1 || Tointon Family Stadium || Hunter || Jungmann || Allen || 2,630 || 32–12 || 11–7
|- align="center" bgcolor="#ffdddd"
| 46 || May 8 || #1 Texas || 2–17 || Tointon Family Stadium || Green || Bahramzadeh ||   || 3,189 || 32–13 || 11–8
|- align="center" bgcolor="#ffdddd"
| 47 || May 9 || #1 Texas || 5–6 || Tointon Family Stadium || Milner || Marshall || Ruffin || 1,548 || 32–14  || 11–9
|- align="center" bgcolor="#ddffdd"
| 48 || May 14 || at  || 5–4 || Hoglund Ballpark || Rooke || Walz || Allen || 1,663 || 33–15 || 12–9
|- align="center" bgcolor="#ffdddd"
| 49 || May 15 || Kansas || 3–7 || Tointon Family Stadium  || Selik || Hunter ||   || 2,296 || 33–16 || 12–10
|- align="center" bgcolor="#ddffdd"
| 50 || May 16 || Kansas || 8–5 || Tointon Family Stadium  || Marshall || Blankenship ||   || 1,429 || 34–16 || 13–10
|- align="center" bgcolor="#ddffdd"
| 51 || May 21 || at  || 8–7 (10)  || Olsen Field || Allen || Fleece ||   || 3,281 || 35–16 || 14–10
|- align="center" bgcolor="#ffdddd"
| 52 || May 22 || at Texas A&M || 2–10 || Olsen Field || Stripling || Hunter ||   || 3,764 || 35–17 || 14–11
|- align="center" bgcolor="#ffdddd"
| 53 || May 23 || at Texas A&M || 2–3 || Olsen Field || Uriegas || Marshall || Stilson || 3,119 || 35–18 || 14–12
|-

|- align="center" bgcolor="#ffdddd"
| 1 || May 26 || Baylor || 8–11  || Bricktown Ballpark || Kempf || Marshall ||   || 5,003 || 35–19  || 0–1
|- align="center" bgcolor="#ddffdd"
| 2 || May 28 || Kansas || 10–5 || Bricktown Ballpark || Hunter || Selik || Allen || 5,855 || 36–19 || 1–1
|- align="center" bgcolor="#ffdddd"
| 3 || May 29 || Oklahoma || 2–13 (8) ||  Bricktown Ballpark || Shore || Daniel ||  || 5,817 || 36–20 ||  1–2
|-

|- align="center" bgcolor="#ffdddd"
| 1 || June 4 || # 23  || 6–8 || Baum Stadium || Lambert || Allen || Conley || 2,518 || 36–21  || 0–1
|- align="center" bgcolor="#ddffdd"
| 2 || June 5 ||  || 9–8 || Baum Stadium  || Bahramzadeh || Turner || Allen || 5,375 || 37–21 || 1–1
|- align="center" bgcolor="#ffdddd"
| 3 || June 6 || # 23 Washington State || 9–6 || Baum Stadium || Ochoa || Lindsey || Harvey || 5,061 || 37–22 || 1–2
|-

|-
|

Awards and honors 
Sophomore outfielder Nick Martini was named the league's co-Player of the Year, the first time a Wildcat had received the honor since Craig Wilson in 1992. It was K-State's third specialty award in the past two years after A.J. Morris was named Pitcher of the Year and Brad Hill as Coach of the Year in 2009. Martini shared the Player of the Year award with Missouri's Aaron Seene.

Martini was one of three Wildcats to earn first-team All-Big 12 honors as he was joined on the squad by senior third baseman Adam Muenster and junior shortstop Carter Jurica. It was the most first-team members for Kansas State since the Wildcats placed three on the All-Big Eight team in 1995

Sophomore pitcher Evan Marshall was named to the second team. He has been stellar for the Wildcats since making a switch from starter to reliever midway through the season. Marshall is 5–3 with a 3.76 ERA this season, but holds a 1.82 ERA in 17 relief appearances since moving to the bullpen. In 34 innings as a relief pitcher, Marshall is limiting opponents to a .165 batting average, including a .162 mark in Big 12 play.

Senior catcher Daniel Dellasega and sophomore pitcher Kyle Hunter were named honorable mention All-Big 12. Coupled with the seven All-Big 12 honorees last season, the 13 Wildcats to earn All-Big 12 honors over the last two seasons are the most in a two-year span since 2001–02.

Wildcats in the 2010 MLB Draft 
The following members of the 2010 Kansas State Wildcats baseball team were drafted in the 2010 MLB Draft.

*2010 Signee

See also 
 Kansas State University
 Kansas State Wildcats
 Kansas State Wildcats baseball
 Tointon Family Stadium
 Brad Hill

References 

Kansas State Wildcats baseball seasons
Kansas State Wildcats Baseball Team, 2010
Kansas State Wildcats Baseball
Kansas State